Miguel Ángel Brindisi de Marco (born 8 October 1950) is an Argentine football coach and former player. An attacking midfielder, he played for the Argentina national team at the 1974 FIFA World Cup.

Playing career

Born in the Almagro neighborhood of Buenos Aires, Brindisi played most of his career in two spells at Club Atlético Huracán, but he also had spells with Spanish side UD Las Palmas, Uruguayan side Nacional and Argentine teams Boca Juniors and with Racing Club during their spell in the Second Division. Whilst at Las Palmas he helped them to the 1978 Copa del Rey Final where his goal was unable to prevent them losing 3–1 to FC Barcelona.

Brindisi was part of two Argentine championship winning sides, his first title was the 1973 Metropolitano with Club Atlético Huracán. Managed by César Menotti, that squad is widely regarded as one of the best Argentine teams ever, with Brindisi being a key player along with René Houseman, Carlos Babington and Omar Larrosa.

After some seasons playing abroad Argentina, Brindisi was traded to Boca Juniors, where he won his second title, the 1981 Metropolitano. Coached by Silvio Marzolini, Brindisi made a memorable duo with Diego Maradona, also scoring many goals for the team.

Brindisi was also the Argentine Primera's top scorer in the Metropolitano championship of 1972 with 21 goals.

Brindisi played for the Argentina national team making 46 appearances and scoring 17 goals.

Managerial career
Brindisi made his debut as a head coach with Club Alumni de Villa María in 1986 his next club was CSD Municipal of Guatemala, which he led to the Liga Nacional de Guatemala title in 1987 and 1988. The next club team Brindisi took charge of was Barcelona Sporting Club in Ecuador where he lad the team to the national championship in 1989 and 1991 and to the Libertadores Cup finals in 1990. He then had spells in charge of RCD Espanyol and UD Las Palmas in Spain. After managing in Guatemala several years he went on to become coach of the Guatemala national team, of which he was in charge during the 1994 World Cup qualification process and on a second tenure in 1997. Brindisi took over at Club Atlético Independiente in the Primera division, he helped the club to win three titles; Clausura 1994, Supercopa Sudamericana 1994 and Recopa Sudamericana 1995. Brindisi then had a spell in charge of his former club and Independiente's fiercest rivals; Racing Club, and a period in charge of Huracán. Brindisi took over at Club Atlético Lanús in 2003, then became manager of Boca Juniors in July 2004, but resigned after only 22 games following a defeat to River Plate. He then became manager of Comunicaciones in 2005.

Brindisi was the head coach of Chiapas of Mexico and was fired on 5 May 2009.

He was appointed as the manager for Huracán in September 2009 and was resigned due to serious danger of relegation on the 2010/11 seasons.

In November 2014, it was reported that he is one of the coaches who applied for vacant India job.

Honours

Player
Huracán
Primera División: 1973 Metropolitano

Boca Juniors
Primera División: 1981 Metropolitano

Individual
Argentine Primera División top scorer: 1972 Metropolitano (21 goals)
Footballer of the Year of Argentina: 1973
AFA Team of All Time (published 2015)

Manager
CSD Municipal
Liga Nacional: 1987, 1988

Barcelona S.C.
Campeonato Ecuatoriano de Fútbol: 1989, 1991

Independiente
Primera División: 1994 Clausura
Supercopa Sudamericana: 1994
Recopa Sudamericana: 1995

References

External links

 

1950 births
Living people
Association football midfielders
Association football forwards
Argentine footballers
Club Atlético Huracán footballers
Boca Juniors footballers
Racing Club de Avellaneda footballers
Footballers from Buenos Aires
1974 FIFA World Cup players
Argentina international footballers
La Liga players
UD Las Palmas players
Club Nacional de Football players
Argentine Primera División players
Argentine football managers
Barcelona S.C. managers
RCD Espanyol managers
Club Atlético Independiente managers
Racing Club de Avellaneda managers
Club Atlético Huracán managers
Club Atlético Lanús managers
Boca Juniors managers
Atlas F.C. managers
UD Las Palmas managers
Chiapas F.C. managers
Guatemala national football team managers
Comunicaciones F.C. managers
C.S.D. Municipal managers
Argentine expatriate footballers
Argentine expatriate sportspeople in Spain
Expatriate footballers in Spain
Argentine expatriate sportspeople in Uruguay
Expatriate footballers in Uruguay
Argentine expatriate football managers
Argentine expatriate sportspeople in Guatemala
Expatriate football managers in Guatemala
Sport in Brindisi